Kogaku may refer to:

Kogaku, a Neo-Confucian school of thought in Japan, see kokugaku
Kogaku, journal of the Optical Society of Japan